The Men's scratch was held on 19 October 2016.

Results

References

Men's scratch
European Track Championships – Men's scratch